ECLIPSE (ECSS Compliant Toolset for Information and Projects Support of Enterprises in Space) is a suite of software applications, intended for use by aerospace project and mission teams in managing their CM/QA/PA/PM activities.

The ECLIPSE developer says that ECLIPSE provides to its users a straightforward path to compliance with ECSS standards.

ECLIPSE was formally introduced to members of the aerospace industry at the following events:
 International Space System Engineering Conference, 1 to 4 June 2010, Budapest, Hungary
 ESA Knowledge Management Conference, 21 to 23 June 2010, European Space Operations Centre (ESOC), Darmstadt, Germany

Currently the toolset is used by the European Space Agency (ESA) and members of the European aerospace industry.

Features 

ECLIPSE supports the following activities:
 Document Management
 Configuration Management
 Cost Control
 Dashboards
 Action Management
 Risk Management
 Non-Conformance Management 
 Quality Assurance
 Product Assurance
 Project Management
 Knowledge Management
 Technology Management
 Time Tracking
 WBS

Modules 

ECLIPSE contains the following modules:

References

External links
ECLIPSE
Sapienza Consulting
European Cooperation for Space Standardization (ECSS Standards)

Aerospace engineering software
Document management systems
Risk management software
Project management software
Quality management
Technical communication
Information systems
Knowledge management